Haedus is a genus of lace bugs in the family Tingidae. There are at least 30 described species in Haedus.

Species
These 32 species belong to the genus Haedus:

References

Further reading

 
 
 
 
 
 
 
 
 
 
 

Tingidae
Articles created by Qbugbot